Agustina of Aragon (Spanish: Agustina de Aragón) is a 1950 Spanish historical film directed by Juan de Orduña and starring Aurora Bautista. It is also known by the alternative title of The Siege. It portrays the Spanish patriot Agustina of Aragon, known for her role at the 1808 Siege of Zaragoza against Napoleon's French forces.

The film's sets were designed by Sigfrido Burmann. It was made by CIFESA, Spain's largest studio.

Plot 
French troops led by Napoleon besiege the city of Zaragoza. Agustina de Aragón (Aurora Bautista) is a young woman who, upon learning that her boyfriend has sold out to the enemy, breaks up with him and falls in love with a Baturro guerrilla. In one of the French attacks, a grenade exploded near the position where Agustina was, falling the soldiers defending the position and there was a threat that the enemy troops could enter the city. Gustine walked through the dead and wounded to a cannon and opened fire. Surprise gripped both sides. Thus, Agustina managed to maintain the situation until Spanish reinforcements arrived.

Cast
 Aurora Bautista as Agustina 
 Fernando Aguirre
 Valeriano Andrés as Capitán con Gobernador  
 Manuel Arbó as Padre  
 María Asquerino as Carmen  
 Francisco Bernal as Paleto  
 Faustino Bretaño 
 José Bódalo as Capitán francés  
 Raúl Cancio as Maño  
 María Cañete as Tía Pilar  
 Alfonso de Córdoba 
 Eugenio Domingo as Niño en iglesia  
 Adriano Domínguez 
 Juan Espantaleón as Tío Jorge  
 Eduardo Fajardo as Luis Montana  
 Fernando Fernández de Córdoba as Gobernador  
 Félix Fernández 
 Rosario García Ortega 
 José Jaspe 
 Manuel Luna as Tío Francisco  
 Arturo Marín 
 Guillermo Marín as Napoléon Bonaparte  
 Pilar Muñoz 
 Fernando Nogueras as Fernando  
 José Orjas 
 Miguel Pastor as Mariscal Lacoste  
 Nicolás D. Perchicot as Viejo con niño  
 Francisco Pierrá 
 Antonia Plana as Madre de Juan  
 Fernando Rey as General Palafox / Lorenzo, el pastor  
 Fernando Sancho as Escudella  
 Virgilio Teixeira as Juan, el Bravo  
 Jesús Tordesillas as Coronel Torres 
 Aníbal Vela as Emisario del Mariscal Lacoste  
 Juan Vázquez 
 Pablo Álvarez Rubio

References

Bibliography 
 Klossner, Michael. The Europe of 1500-1815 on Film and Television: A Worldwide Filmography of Over 2550 Works, 1895 Through 2000. McFarland & Company, 2002.

External links 
 

1950s historical films
Spanish historical films
1950 films
1950s Spanish-language films
Films directed by Juan de Orduña
Films set in the 19th century
Lippert Pictures films
Cifesa films
Films scored by Juan Quintero Muñoz
Spanish black-and-white films
Peninsular War films
Spanish war films
1950s Spanish films